The Tahoe Transportation District, formally known as South Tahoe Area Transit Authority and BlueGO, is the primary provider of mass transportation in the Lake Tahoe region of northcentral California and northwestern Nevada. The service uniquely provides 24-hour-per-day service, with fixed routes functioning from 5:45 am to 1:45 am and flexible night owl service operating in the short remaining hours. Park and ride locations are available for intercity service in Carson City, Stateline, and Gardnerville, Nevada. The agency also operates various shuttles during peak ski season. This transportation service is now known as, Tahoe Transportation District. http://tahoetransportation.org/

Bankruptcy 

In November 2010, South Lake Tahoe Area Transit Authority was taken over by Tahoe Transportation District due to bankruptcy

Routes
19X Gardnerville to Carson City
22 Stateline Transit Center to Douglas County Community/Senior Center
50 South Y Transit Center to Stateline Transit Center
55 South Y Transit Center to Kingsburg Transit Center

References

www.bluego.org

External links
 BlueGO

Bus transportation in California
Bus transportation in Nevada
Transit agencies in California
Public transportation in Nevada